Congressman King may refer to:
Peter T. King, US Representative from New York
Steve King, US Representative from Iowa

Angus King is also a member of Congress.

See also
King (surname)